Hosea Nelson is an American chemist who is a professor at California Institute of Technology. His research investigates the design and total synthesis of complex molecules. He was a finalist for the 2021 Blavatnik Awards for Young Scientists.

Early life and education 
Nelson grew up in San Francisco and has said that his parents were hippies. He started his career working in construction. He decided that he wanted to attend college, but wasn't sure what he wanted to specialize in. He took some biology courses at a community college, and secured a job working at San Francisco State University. Nelson became fascinated by scientific research, and particularly interested in the design and synthesis of molecules. After four years, Nelson started study at University of California, Berkeley, where he completed a chemistry degree in two years. Nelson then got a job at Panasonic energy solutions, in Silicon Valley, working on solar power and batteries. He was contacted by a Professor from University of California, Berkeley, who helped him identify funding for graduate school. Nelson was a doctoral researcher at California Institute of Technology, where he worked with Brian Stoltz. He focused on total synthesis in the plant Thapsia garganica.

Research and career 
Nelson worked as a postdoctoral researcher in catalysis. His preliminary ideas were scooped, and instead he dedicated time to ion pairing. In 2015, Nelson started his own laboratory at University of California, Los Angeles.  Nelson was appointed Professor of Chemistry at California Institute of Technology in 2021. He is interested in green chemistry, sustainable synthesis and developing characterizing protocols. He makes use of scanning electron microscopy to image molecular systems. In particular, Nelson developed microcrystal electron diffraction (MicroED) to identify the locations of atoms within molecules at high resolution. He uses MicroED to design new pharmaceuticals and understand the interactions of biomolecules with the human body.

Selected publications

Awards and honors
Nelson attended the Kavli Frontiers of Science ceremony in 2020 and was a finalist for the 2021 Blavatnik Awards for Young Scientists. He was selected as one of Chemical & Engineering News Talented 12.

References 

People from San Francisco
California Institute of Technology alumni
University of California, Berkeley alumni
California Institute of Technology faculty
21st-century American chemists
Year of birth missing (living people)
Living people